The CECED Convergence Working Group has defined a new platform, called CHAIN (Ceced Home Appliances Interoperating
Network), which defines a protocol for interconnecting different home appliances in a single multibrand system.

It allows for control and automation of all basic appliance-related services in a home: e.g., remote control of appliance operation, energy or load management, remote diagnostics and automatic maintenance support to appliances, downloading and updating of data, programs  and services (possibly from the Internet).

See also
 CECED
 KNX/EIB
 LonWorks
 OSGi

Home automation
Interoperability

ja:欧州家電機器委員会#CHAIN